Hitler Bad, Vandals Good is the seventh studio album by the southern California punk rock band The Vandals, released in 1998 by Nitro Records.

Composition
Much of the album is characterized by the pop-punk music and humorous lyrics for which the band is known, and it became their most popular and commercially successful album to date. While the band has utilized humor as a basis for much of their lyrical content throughout their career, the humor on their previous album The Quickening had been rooted heavily in sarcasm and dealt with themes of nihilism, anarchism and apathy. By comparison, the humor in Hitler Bad, Vandals Good is more lighthearted, dealing with subjects such as girlfriends, fast food and hairstyles.

The album contains two cover songs. "Come Out Fighting" was originally performed by fellow southern California punk rock band Pennywise and is dedicated to the memory of Pennywise bassist Jason Matthew Thirsk, who had committed suicide the previous year. "So Long, Farwell" is a Rodgers and Hammerstein song from the musical The Sound of Music, which has here been re-interpreted using electric guitar, bass and drums as the closing song on the album.

Release
Hitler Bad, Vandals Good was released in June 1998. In November 1999, the band toured South America with the Offspring. An independent music video was later filmed for the song "My Girlfriend's Dead." Two different videos were released: One features the band members and was filmed as part of the Kung Fu Films movie That Darn Punk in 2000, while the other is a fan-created animated video that was included on one of Kung Fu Records' DVD releases.

Track listing

Personnel
Dave Quackenbush - vocals
Warren Fitzgerald - guitar, keyboards, backing vocals
Joe Escalante - bass, backing vocals
Josh Freese - drums, cymbals, backing vocals
Gabe McNair - trombone on "F'd Up Girl"
Jason Freese - saxophone on "F'd Up Girl"
Stan Freese - tuba on "I Know, Huh?"
Adrian Young - bongos on "If the Gov't Could Read My Mind"
Dexter Holland - co-wrote "Too Much Drama"

Technical
John Ewing - engineer
Steve Mixdorf - engineer
Elvis - assistant engineer
Craig Neep - engineer
Warren Fitgerald  - engineer
Warren Fitzgerald - engineer
Greg Koller  - engineer
John Tyree  - engineer
Jerry Finn - engineer
Warren Fitzgerald - producer, artwork
Mackie Osborne - design
Lisa Johnson - band photo

References

1998 albums
Nitro Records albums
The Vandals albums